A Wonderful Life is a 1951 black-and-white short drama film produced by the National Council of Churches of Christ and distributed by the Protestant Film Commission. It is an adaptation of Frank Capra's 1946 film It's a Wonderful Life for the Christian film industry. Directed by William Beaudine, it stars James Dunn, Allene Roberts, and Arthur Shields. The film retells the life of an ordinary Christian family man in flashback as his family and friends remember all the good he did through his devotion to church and community. The film emphasizes the power of faith, love, and community service for living a meaningful life, together with the message that people do not realize the true worth of others until after they have died. The film was not released commercially, but was distributed to some 30,000 churches throughout the United States and Canada.

Plot
Henry Wood (James Dunn) is an ordinary Christian family man who lives with faith, love, and dedication to his church and community in the fictional Martinville, Missouri. However, his acquaintances and family consider him naïve and someone who is easily taken advantage of. After his unexpected death, his family and friends gather to reminisce about his life, seen in flashback. Henry's daughter Mary is bitter about the way he never received remuneration for serving as treasurer in a host of committees, leaving the family to struggle financially. But after Henry's life and his effect on other people is reexamined—including his care of Mary when she was diagnosed with infantile paralysis, and his providing the funds to send her to college—Mary realizes that her father did live a meaningful life, and resolves to emulate his commitment to do good for others.

Cast
James Dunn as Henry Wood
Allene Roberts as Mary Wood
Isabel Withers as Jennie Wood
Arthur Shields as Pastor
Madge Crane as Grandma Wood
Donna Jo Boyce as Mary Wood (age 9)
Jack Larson as Richard Wood (age 16)
David Kasday as Richard Wood (age 7)
Andrew Tombes as Harry Jenkins

Production

Development
A Wonderful Life is an adaptation of Frank Capra's 1946 film It's a Wonderful Life for the Christian film industry. The death of an ordinary Christian family man leaves a "spiritual vacuum" among his friends and neighbors due to his selfless acts of charity for his church and community. The story was inspired by a real-life case in Sedalia, Missouri. The original screenplay was written by Alan Shilin. The voice-over narration was supplied by Arthur Shields, who played the pastor.

The film was one of 11 short features directed by William Beaudine for the Protestant Film Commission. Beaudine was considered ideal for the job because of his "aversion to preaching": he was able "to create films with a strong story whose message was evident but not overwhelming". Technical advisers included Rev. S. Franklin Mack, an ordained Presbyterian minister who was director of films for the Broadcasting and Film Commission of the National Council of Churches of Christ, and Oscar Rumpf, who once served as a minister in Sedalia.

Producer Paul F. Heard and associate producer Barney Sarecky completed the film for the National Council of Churches of Christ.

Filming
Beaudine typically finished this and similar films on a six-day shooting schedule.  The production, staged at KTTV studios in Los Angeles, with exterior scenes filmed in Sedalia, Missouri, was completed in December 1950.

Release
The film was distributed exclusively to churches throughout the United States and Canada. These included Congregational Christian Churches, Presbyterian Church U.S.A., Evangelical churches, and Reformed churches, with a reach estimated at some 30,000 churches.

Awards
The film won first prize in the Protestant Religious Section at the first annual film festival sponsored by the Film Council of Greater Boston in 1951.

References

Sources

External links

1951 short films
1951 films
Films about Christianity
Films shot in Los Angeles
Films shot in Missouri
American drama short films
1951 drama films
American black-and-white films
1950s English-language films
1950s American films